Patricia Berjak  (29 December 1939 – 21 January 2015) was a South African botanist known for her work on the biology of plant seeds, especially seed recalcitrance. She was professor for 48 years at the University of Kwazulu-Natal (UKZN). 

She earned a B.Sc. degree in biochemistry at the University of the Witwatersrand (1962), then went on to the University of Natal (now UKZN), earning a M.Sc. in mammalian physiology and biochemistry (1966) and PhD in seed biology (1969). She was a member of the Academy of Science of South Africa, and a Fellow of the University of Natal, the Royal Society of South Africa and the Third World Academy of Sciences. She was awarded the Order of Mapungubwe (Silver) in 2006.

References

Further reading

1939 births
2015 deaths
21st-century South African botanists
South African women botanists
Fellows of the Royal Society of South Africa
20th-century South African botanists
20th-century South African women scientists
Academic staff of the University of KwaZulu-Natal
University of Natal alumni
Academic staff of the University of Natal
University of the Witwatersrand alumni
21st-century South African women scientists